The Arsonists of Europe (German: Die Brandstifter Europas) is a 1926 Austrian silent drama film directed by Max Neufeld and starring Charlotte Ander, Eugen Neufeld and Robert Valberg. It was shot at the Sievering Studios in Vienna. The film's sets were designed by Artur Berger.

Cast
 Max Neufeld as Rasputin
 Eugen Neufeld as Großfürst  
 Robert Valberg as Oberst Redl
 Albert von Kersten as Michael Korsakow  
 Albert Heine as Purischkjewitsch
 Eugen Dumont as Wladimir Iljitsch Lenin
 Hans Marr as Iwan Avadieff  
 Charlotte Ander as Olga  
 Victor Kutschera as Chef des russischen Spionagedienstes  
 Heinz Hanus as Zar Nikolaus II
 Hermann Benke as Oberst Wronsky  
 Renati Renee as Tänzerin Sonja Starewna  
 Fritz Freisler as Kriegsminister  
 Lorenz Corvinus as General Schamovsky  
 Viktor Braun as Oberst Graf Sumarokow  
 Wilhelm Schmidt as Major Gregoriew  
 K. Loibner as Zarewitsch
 Herma Exdorf as Janischkaja  
 Ignaz Flemminger as Major Talam  
 Margarete Thumann

References

Bibliography
 Grange, William. Cultural Chronicle of the Weimar Republic. Scarecrow Press, 2008.

External links

1926 films
Austrian silent feature films
Films directed by Max Neufeld
1926 drama films
Austrian drama films
Austrian black-and-white films
Silent drama films
Films shot at Sievering Studios
1920s German-language films